Tale about the Lost Time is a 1964 Soviet fantasy film directed by Aleksandr Ptushko. It is based on a tale by Evgeny Schwartz.

Plot
The protagonist, third-grader Petya Zubov, is first shown as a lazy boy who is wasting time. After waking up in the morning, he walks around the city, as he is not worried about arriving late for school. Once upon a time, four evil wizards, whose main mission in life is to do bad to people, realize that they are old and cannot work the way they used to. They decide to regain their youth. To do this they must find a few young lazy children to collect time that is spent ineptly, and then use it to make and eat flatbread.

The wizards set out on a quest. They manage to find children who are wasting their time (including Petya), and to collect their lost time into sacks. After that, the children instantly age. The wizards make flatbread from flour and add the collected time. However, they eat more than necessary, and they turn into children. After coming to school, Petya sees that he has grown old. However, he thinks he is just still asleep. After deliberating, he decides not to wake up yet. After seeing his class and introducing himself as his own grandfather, he goes to the city, where he tries himself in various adult roles, which end in failure because he is not well-versed in anything.

He decides to wake up and discovers that he cannot. Even his own mother cannot recognize him. Only his dog Druzhok still comes to him. Lacking money, Petya decides to go with his dog to the forest where no humans have ever set foot. Thus, he enters the Magic Forest, where evil wizards live. Reaching their dwelling, Petya finds nobody at home. Entering the empty house, he talks to the magic cuckoo clock and gives it water, which the wizards never did.

The cuckoo agrees to help Petya back to his former state and explains to him that it is merely necessary to turn the hour hand on the wizard's watch back three times, while chanting the spell. The spell will be broken, and the wizards will disappear. This should be done before sunset, but after this it will be impossible to remove the spell. Petya learns from the cuckoo that two girls and one boy who turned into old people, and if Petya turns the arrow without their presence, he will turn into a boy, but they will never return to their proper ages. Petya decides to first find the children, and then break the spell.

While the wizards are making dirty tricks, Petya and Druzhok look for and find the transformed children. The wizards realize that their spell is over and hurry home, trying to overtake the old men and hide the clock. A pursuit commences. All arrive almost simultaneously to the house of magicians. But Petya and the other enchanted children remove the spell and become children again, and the wizards disappear, and they all lived happily ever after.

The film plot is harder than the book (book is even shorter that The Nutcracker and the Mouse King and has only 3 mages/children) and short film.

Cast

Leading roles
Grigory Plotkin – Petya Zubov, a pupil of the 3rd grade "B" (voiced by Maria Vinogradova)
Vera Volkova – Marusya Morozova
Lydia Konstantinova – Nadia
Mikhail Kulaev – Vasya
Oleg Anofriyev – old Petya
Lyudmila Shagalova – old Marousia
Rina Zelyonaya – old Nadia
Savely Kramarov – old Vasya

Evil Wizards
Sergey Martinson – Prokofy Prokofievich
Georgy Vitsin – Andrey Andreevich
Irina Murzaeva – Anna Ivanovna
Valentina Telegina – Avdotya Petrovna
Evgeny Sokolov – Prokofy Prokofievich after aging in reverse
Sergey Karponosov – Andrei Andreevich after aging in reverse
Zinaida Kukushkina – Anna Ivanovna after aging in reverse
Tatyana Dontsenko – Avdotya Petrovna after aging in reverse

Supporting roles
Yury Chekulaev – truck driver
Vadim Grachyov – Maslyuchenko, police sergeant
Yevgeny Morgunov – owner of "Moskvich"
Grigory Shpigel – first aid doctor / apple buyer in a hat
Eva Sinelnikova – cuckoo (voice)

Episodic roles
Nina Grebeshkova – Marya Sergeevna, teacher of the 3rd grade "B"
Margarita Zharova – a pie seller
Muse of Krepkogorskaya – mother of Petya
Alexandra Panova is an old woman with a string bag
V. Ryabtseva – head of the department in the magazine "Murzilka"
Zoya Fyodorova – aunt Natasha, cloakroom attendant at the school
Zoya Vasilkova – Lisa, the saleswoman of apples (in credits as "Z. Chekulaev")
Sergei Romodanov – grandfather with a newspaper on a bench
Ivan Ryzhov – Petrovich, foreman at the construction site
Nikolay Yudin – fisherman
Yan Yanakiev – Ivan Gurgenovich, Petya's neighbor (in credits as "K. Yanakiev")
Marina Kuznetsova – Zina Kutiapina, the girl at the blackboard
Yevgeny Eliseev – Kolya Makarov, Petya's classmate

References

External links

1960s children's fantasy films
Soviet children's fantasy films
1960s Russian-language films
Russian children's fantasy films
Films directed by Aleksandr Ptushko
Mosfilm films
Films based on fairy tales